Voluntas: International Journal of Voluntary and Nonprofit Organizations is a peer-reviewed academic journal covering research on the third sector.  It is the official journal of the International Society for Third-Sector Research. It was established in 1990 with Helmut Anheier and Martin Knapp as its founding editors-in-chief. Its current editors are Ruth Simsa (University of Vienna)  & Taco Brandsen (Radboud University Nijmegen).

References

External links 
 
 International Society for Third-Sector Research

Publications established in 1990
Springer Science+Business Media academic journals
Quarterly journals
English-language journals
Political science journals
Academic journals associated with international learned and professional societies